Marmoricola aquaticus is a bacterium from the genus Marmoricola which has been isolated from the sponge Glodia corticostylifera in Sao Paulo, Brazil.

References

External links 

Type strain of Marmoricola aquaticus at BacDive -  the Bacterial Diversity Metadatabase

Propionibacteriales
Bacteria described in 2015